My One and Only is a musical with a book by Peter Stone and Timothy S. Mayer and music and lyrics by George and Ira Gershwin. The musical ran on Broadway and West End.

Plot overview
Written to incorporate classic Gershwin tunes from Funny Face and other popular shows into one evening of entertainment, the plot, set in 1927 America, revolves around Capt. Billy Buck Chandler, a barnstorming aviator, and Edith Herbert, an ex-English Channel swimmer and the star of Prince Nicolai Erraclyovitch Tchatchavadze's International Aquacade. Billy's plan to be the first man to fly solo across the Atlantic Ocean is sidetracked by his determination to win Edith's hand, and he takes a crash course in sophistication at Mr. Magix' Tonsorial and Sartorial Emporial to help him achieve his goal. What follows is a series of escapades and misadventures that seems destined to keep the potential lovers apart forever.

Background
Just prior to out of town tryouts in Boston, the original director, Peter Sellars, was fired, with the musical director and arranger, the book writer, Tim Mayer, and set designer, Adrianne Lobel, dismissed soon after. Tommy Tune "nominally took over the direction with his co-director and co-choreographer Thommie Walsh, and Mike Nichols, Tony Walton and...Michael Bennett were brought in to help with the direction, choreography and set design."

Productions

My One and Only opened on Broadway at the St. James Theatre on May 1, 1983 and closed on March 3, 1985 after 767 performances and 37 previews. The musical was directed and choreographed by Thommie Walsh and Tommy Tune. Musical and Vocal Direction was by Jack Lee. The cast included Tune, Twiggy, Bunny Briggs, Roscoe Lee Browne, Denny Dillon, Charles "Honi" Coles, and Nana Visitor. Notable replacements during the run included Sandy Duncan, Don Correia, Jeff Calhoun, and Georgia Engel.

The musical opened in the UK at the Chichester Festival Theatre and then opened in the West End at the Piccadilly Theatre in February 2002, starring Janie Dee as Edythe Herbert and Tim Flavin as Captain Billy Buck Chandler, with direction by Loveday Ingram and choreography by Craig Revel Horwood.

Cabaret singer and Gershwin historian Michael Feinstein served as the musical consultant for the project.  An extensive review of the show's creation can be found in his book Nice Work If You Can Get It in a chapter entitled "My One and Only Tommy Tune Fling." He noted in The Gershwins and Me: A Personal History in Twelve Songs "I kept trying to steer them away from what I perceived to be a mauling of George and Ira's work.... Finally the show's orchestrator told me ...to get out of town. Eventually Ira threw up his hands and said 'Let them do their worst'.  In fairness, I have to note that 'My One and Only' was a big hit."

There were several tours, all with Tommy Tune. The first was in 1985 with Sandy Duncan which started at the Kennedy Center in March 1985 and included a six-week engagement in Japan. Lucie Arnaz replaced Duncan in this tour. Stephanie Zimbalist starred in the US national tour in 1987.

Songs

Act I
 I Can't Be Bothered Now – The New Rhythm Boys, Billy, Edith, Prince Nikki, Mickey, and Ensemble
 Blah, Blah, Blah – Billy
 Boy Wanted – Edith and Reporter
 Soon – Billy
 High Hat/Sweet and Low – Magix, Billy, The New Rhythm Boys, and Ensemble
 Just Another Rhumba – Montgomery and Ensemble
 He Loves and She Loves – Billy and Edith
 'S Wonderful – Billy and Edith
 Strike Up the Band – Billy

Act II
 In The Swim – Fish and Nikki
 Nice Work If You Can Get It – Edith
 My One And Only – Magix and Billy
 Funny Face – Mickey and Nikki
 Kicking The Clouds Away – Montgomery and Ensemble
 How Long Has This Been Going On? – Edith and Billy

Original Casts

Recording
The original Broadway cast album was released on the Atlantic label (7 80110-2-1) in 1983, running 55:15.
William Ruhlmann wrote: "As heard here, then, the music is basically a Gershwin sampler, as performed largely by Tune (leaning heavily on his Texas accent) and Twiggy (singing in a rather mannered British croon), with added appearances by Charles "Honi" Coles and Roscoe Lee Browne. On-stage, 'My One and Only' is a dance-oriented show, and that can't be re-created on disc. But the singers give lively performances of some well-known Gershwin songs." Produced by Ahmet Ertegun, Wally Harper and Mike Bernaker. Didier C. Deutsch produced the CD reissue in 1989.

Critical response
Frank Rich reviewed for The New York Times, and noted that "During this production's troubled gestation period, seemingly half of show business pitched in to offer anonymous help – no doubt the half that wasn't toiling on the screenplay of Tootsie. The result of the effort is not the brilliant musical the theater desperately craves, but nonetheless a slick one, brimming with high-hat confidence." He went on to write "The second half of the handsome show at the St. James levitates with some of the most inspired choreography Broadway has seen in several seasons – all set to the celestial music of George Gershwin and danced to kill by a company glittering in Art Deco swank. Until then, My One and Only is a smart and happy, if less than electrifying, spin down memory lane. Yet even at its most innocuous, this show receives a considerable boost from its Gershwin songs: the entire score, stitched together by a pastiche period book, derives from the Broadway trove created by the composer and his brother, Ira, a half-century ago." Broadway wags dubbed the show "My Nine and Only," partly because of Tommy Tune's association with both this musical and "Nine," and partly because of the number of people who contributed to the writing, choreography and direction.

Awards and nominations

Original Broadway production

Original London production

References

External links
 
synopsis at Tams-Witmark

1983 musicals
Broadway musicals
Original musicals
Fiction set in 1927
Musicals set in the Roaring Twenties
United States in fiction
Musicals by George Gershwin
Musicals by Peter Stone
Tony Award-winning musicals